Hillside is a suburb in Melbourne, Victoria, Australia,  north-west of Melbourne's Central Business District, located within the Cities of Brimbank and Melton local government areas. Hillside recorded a population of 17,331 at the 2021 census.

There is another locality in Victoria named Hillside, a small rural district near Bairnsdale.

The suburb of Hillside was previously part of the neighbouring suburb of Sydenham, however its name was changed to Hillside approximately 18 years ago. It has estates with names of Cypress Rise, Banchory Grove, Parkwood Green, Bellevue Hill, Sugargum Estate, Hillside 2000 and Regency Rise. A large water tower (known as "The Golf Ball" by locals) exists in the estate of The Bellevue, which can be seen from several kilometres around and, along with the large radio transmission towers in nearby Delahey, is a major landmark of the outer north-western suburban area.

The streets of Hillside are lined with plane trees, which were planted during the farming days of Hillside. The terrain has a slight slope going up the main street.

Sport

Sydenham Hillside Football Club, an Australian rules football team, competes in the Essendon District Football League.

See also
 City of Keilor – Hillside was previously within this former local government area.

References

Suburbs of Melbourne
Suburbs of the City of Melton
Suburbs of the City of Brimbank